The 2022–23 Drexel Dragons men's basketball team represented Drexel University during the 2022–23 NCAA Division I men's basketball season. The Dragons, led by seventh-year head coach Zach Spiker, played their home games at the Daskalakis Athletic Center in Philadelphia, Pennsylvania as members of the Colonial Athletic Association.

Previous season
The Dragons finished the 2021–22 season 15–14, 10–8 in CAA play to finish in sixth place. They lost to Delaware in the CAA tournament quarterfinals.

On May 10, 2022, following the end of the season, it was announced that assistant coach Rob O'Driscoll would be leaving Drexel after seven seasons to become an assistant basketball coach at Maine.

Offseason

Departures

Incoming transfers

Recruiting classes

2022 recruiting class

2023 recruiting class

Preseason 
In a poll of the league coaches at the CAA's media day, Drexel was picked to finish in seventh place in the CAA. Junior Amari Williams was selected to the Preseason CAA All-Conference Second Team.

Roster

Schedule and results

|-
!colspan=12 style=| Italian trip
|-

|-
!colspan=12 style=| Non-conference regular season
|-

|-
!colspan=12 style=| CAA regular season
|-

|-
!colspan=12 style=| CAA Tournament

Awards
Justin Moore
CAA All-Rookie Team
CAA Rookie of the Week

Amari Williams
Lefty Driesell Award Finalist
CAA Defensive Player of the Year
CAA All-Conference First Team
CAA All-Defensive Team
CAA Player of the Week
Preseason CAA All-Conference Second Team

See also
 2022–23 Drexel Dragons women's basketball team

References

Drexel Dragons men's basketball seasons
Drexel
Drexel
Drexel